The Temple of Harmony is an 18th-century folly in the grounds of Halswell House, Goathurst, Somerset, England. Built in 1767, it is a replica of the 1st-century Temple of Fortuna Virilis in Rome. The Temple stands in Mill Wood, a 17-acre (7 ha) pleasure garden in the grounds of Halswell House, and was built for Sir Charles Kemeys-Tynte in 1767 to designs by Thomas Prowse, with features by Robert Adam and Thomas Stocking. The Temple was dedicated to the memory of a mutual friend, Peregrine Palmer, formerly MP for Oxford University (d 1762).

The Temple has a slate roof and pedimental end gables, and is surrounded with Ionic columns and pilasters. It is aligned north-west/south-east, with the portico at the south-east end, facing Halswell House which lies some  distant.
The Somerset Buildings Preservation Trust (SBPT) acquired the Temple in 1993 in a derelict condition, having been used for many years as a cattle shelter. It has now been restored, with grants from English Heritage and others, and is a Grade II* listed building.

John Walsh's marble statue in the temple depicting Terpsichore, the Muse of joy in the dance and lyric poetry, was dedicated to the memory of Thomas Prowse after his death in 1767. This was copied in 1999 and the copy is now located here. The original is in the Museum of Somerset, Taunton.

The Temple was owned by the Somerset Building Preservation Trust and managed by the Halswell Park Trust for a number of years. In 2020 it was purchased by Edward Strachan, the owner of Halswell House and the surrounding land known as Mill Wood, thus restoring it to its rightful position in the surrounding parkland. 

The Temple can be visited on Sunday afternoons during the summer months and at other times by prior arrangement.

Gallery

References

External links 
The Temple of Harmony from the Somerset Buildings Preservation Trust
Temple of Harmony at Follies and Monuments
Halswell

Buildings and structures in Sedgemoor
Tourist attractions in Somerset
Grade II* listed buildings in Sedgemoor
Buildings and structures completed in 1767
Folly buildings in England
1767 establishments in England